Mevania basalis is a moth of the subfamily Arctiinae. It was described by Francis Walker in 1864. It is found in Colombia and Bolivia.

References

 

Euchromiina
Moths described in 1864